Graham F. Hatfull is the Eberly Family Professor of Biotechnology at the University of Pittsburgh, where he studies bacteriophages. He has been an HHMI professor since 2002, and is the creator of their SEA-PHAGES program.

Life and career 
Hatfull studied biological sciences at Westfield College, University of London from 1975 to 1978. He received his PhD from the University of Edinburgh in 1981. He did postdoctoral research at Yale University and the Medical Research Council.

In 2002, he developed the SEA-PHAGES, originally the PHIRE (Phage Hunters Integrating Research and Education) program, which he originally developed to include 10-12 students per year. The program existed only at the University of Pittsburgh from 2002 to 2008, when the HHMI created the Science Education Alliance Phage Hunters Advancing Genomics and Evolutionary Science (SEA-PHAGES) program. The first year of SEA-PHAGES, the program had 12 participative universities. The program has since spread to more than 100 universities and thousands of students per year.

Honors 
Hatfull is a member of the American Academy of Microbiology, a fellow of the American Association for the Advancement of Science, and in 2020 became a member of the American Academy of Arts & Sciences.

He is also the winner of the 2013 Carski Foundation Distinguished Undergraduate Teaching Award  and the 2020 Peter Wildy Prize.

References 

Alumni of University College London
American biologists
University of Pittsburgh faculty
1957 births
Living people